Rakshak (Hindi for "protector") is the debut album by Indian heavy metal band Bloodywood, independently released on 18 February 2022. The album's music is a blend of Indian folk music and heavy metal, while the lyrics are sung in the English, Hindi and Punjabi languages.

The first single off the album, "Gaddaar", was released on 9 November 2021 and features political commentary, exploring "how politicians rely on dishing out hate in order to gain votes and raise their political standing, and how one can rebel to break the cycle" while advocating for the separation of church and state.

The second single and video, "Aaj", came out on 24 January 2022. The video was shot in Munnar, Kerala, and the band faced a handful of difficulties while doing it, including bad weather, denial of permission for shooting, leeches and accidents with drones.

The album entered the Billboard charts, making them the first Indian metal band to achieve that. The album has been successful on Bandcamp as well, where it topped the album sales of the platform upon release, ranked (as of early March 2022) as the 22nd all-time best-selling new release and as 3rd best-selling metal release.

Background 
Since its inception in 2016, the band has gained attention on the internet with their Indian folk metal covers of pop and Indian songs. They would go on to release a cover album titled  Anti-Pop Vol. 1 with songs by Backstreet Boys, 50 Cent, Ariana Grande, Nirvana and Linkin Park. Rapper Raoul, who was initially a guest, eventually became part of the band.

For their debut album, however, they opted to use only original material, re-recording some earlier songs that had been released in the past. The band claims to have been approached by multiple labels, but decided to stay independent for this album.

Themes 
When asked about the album's meaning, vocalist/rapper Raoul said that it "is about a joint effort to protect people and the planet as a whole from all the challenges we’re facing. We hope to do this by eliminating the challenges altogether, because the best defence is a great offence. You'll hear messages about divisive politics, corruption, toxic news, sexual assault and bullying, as well as personal ones about battling depression and pushing your limits".

The title, which translates as "protector", conveys the sense that "you are your own saviour, you have the strength within you to meet challenges". The artwork features a boy and an elephant behind him; the animal represents "the strength within this fragile creature".

Reception 

The Moshville Times's editor-in-chief Iain "Mosh" Purdie called the album "a superb release especially for those new to the band". He said the band could have made more new music, but that the new and old songs are enough for a live show setlist.

On United News of India, Anand Venkitachalam praised the band's "very unique combination of metal which is a mix of heavy almost Korn like riffs combined with hip hop, electronic music and of course Indian folk music such as bhangra, alternating between rap verses of Raoul Kerr and the growled and clean vocals of Jayanth Bhadula". He was also happy with Raoul Kerr's rapping, which he thought blended well with the band's metal sound. He ultimately said the album "has it all from heaviness to infectious grooves to powerful melodies giving the Indian folk metal group a debut they are can[sic] be very proud of."

Kerrang!s Paul Travers praised the band's more "serious" tone (compared with their covers) and said they "have a sound like no one else in the world right now. Rakshak is equal parts joyous, furious and incendiary and its creators look set to be the first Indian metal band to truly explode on a global scale."

Writing on Blabbermouth.net, Dom Lawson commented that "even with the novelty value of their early works erased, Bloodywood still make a wholly unique racket, with the gently otherworldly allure of those samples providing a consistent red line through a surprisingly diverse set of songs." On the other hand, he thought the group sounded "less convincing" when performing nu metal music, describing "Zanjeero Se" as "fairly thin gruel" compared to the "rambunctious clangor of "Machi Bhasad" and "Endurant"." He ultimately said that "the essence of Bloodywood's cheerfully revolutionary approach to modern metal is on full display and at full pelt with those infectious Bollywood embellishments proudly to the fore. In those moments, if not all of "Rakshak", Bloodywood sound like one of the greatest ideas ever."

TheKenWord, on Angry Metal Guy, said that the band "succeeds in no small part because it expresses complex human experiences through effortlessly accessible writing." He criticized the mixing and mastering of some tracks - namely "Jee Veerey" and "Endurant" - for not properly blending the folk instruments with the metal sound. He also said the rapping vocals sometimes sound "detached" on softer songs.

Metal Hammers Elliot Leaver praised the band's "impressive musical range whilst inherently staying true to their native roots" and ultimately reflected that "if this is what Bloodywood can achieve on their own, imagine where they could go with a label behind them. Surely that's only a matter of time."

Accolades

Track listing

Personnel 
Bloodywood
 Jayant Bhadula – vocals
 Raoul Kerr – rap vocals
 Karan Katiyar – guitars, flutes, arrangements, production

Charts

References 

2022 debut albums
Bloodywood albums